Brighamia rockii, known as the Molokai ohaha or Pua ala in Hawaiian, is a species of flowering plant in the bellflower family, Campanulaceae, that is endemic to the island of Molokai in Hawaii. Associated plants include ōhia lehua (Metrosideros polymorpha), alahee (Psydrax odorata), lama (Diospyros sandwicensis), ūlei (Osteomeles anthyllidifolia), and naupaka (Scaevola gaudichaudii).

Each inflorescence contains three to eight trumpet-shaped white flowers.

Conservation
Pua ala has been extirpated from the islands of Lānai and Maui. Threats to its survival include habitat loss, competition with alien plants, predation by goats and deer, and a lack of pollinators.

There are five occurrences of the plant remaining in the wild, with a total estimated population of fewer than 200. It is federally listed as an endangered species.  It is now pollinated by the introduced hawk moth Daphnis nerii.

Some individuals have been cultivated and planted in their native habitat.

References

External links
USDA Plants Profile

rockii
Endemic flora of Hawaii
Critically endangered plants
Biota of Molokai
Taxonomy articles created by Polbot